Tie-Yan Liu (born 1976) is a Chinese computer scientist.

After completing his degree from the department of electrical engineering at Tsinghua University, Liu began working at the Microsoft Asia Research Institute in 2003, and was appointed vice president of Microsoft Research Asia in 2015. Liu was elected an IEEE fellow in 2017, and granted an equivalent honor by the Association for Computing Machinery in 2021.

References

1976 births
Living people
Tsinghua University alumni
Chinese computer scientists
Fellow Members of the IEEE
Fellows of the Association for Computing Machinery